Frank W. Shields (born March 26, 1945) is an American politician and Methodist minister who served in both houses of the Oregon Legislative Assembly, from 1993 until 2007.

Biography
Shields was born in New Castle, Pennsylvania in 1945.

He served as chair of the Multnomah County Charter Review Committee from 1983 until 1984. Shields was elected to the Oregon House of Representatives in 1992 and to the Oregon Senate in 1998. In 2006, after initially filing for reelection, Shields withdrew from the race, citing health issues.

Personal life
Shields is married to his wife, Becca. He has 2 children: Matthew and Noel, and 2 stepchildren: Trish and Nina.

References

1945 births
Living people
Democratic Party Oregon state senators
Democratic Party members of the Oregon House of Representatives
People from New Castle, Pennsylvania
Politicians from Portland, Oregon
American Methodist clergy
Drew University alumni
Eastern University (United States) alumni
Slippery Rock University of Pennsylvania alumni